Omer Pasha Mosque was built by Ketendji Omer Pasha in 1602. It is located in Elmalı, Antalya Province, Turkey. The mosque, built entirely of cut stone, has a single dome. It reflects the classical Ottoman architecture. The mosque was built on a sloping area with a square plan. The mosque is the biggest Ottoman mosque in the Antalya area.

References

Ottoman mosques in Antalya
Buildings and structures in Antalya Province
1602 establishments in the Ottoman Empire
Mosques completed in 1602